Olli Alho (19 October 1919 – 20 April 2005) was a Finnish hurdler. He competed in the men's 110 metres hurdles at the 1952 Summer Olympics.

References

External links

1919 births
2005 deaths
Athletes (track and field) at the 1952 Summer Olympics
Finnish male hurdlers
Olympic athletes of Finland